Boole is an electronic hybrid act formed in 1996 by Brad Barkett and Mike Barkett at Loyola College in Baltimore, Maryland. The band was formed as a foray into explorations of post-modern forms of popular dance music, in contrast to Brad Barkett's experimental   music project formed in 1990, The Apologizers. The current live lineup consists of Brad Barkett and Mike Barkett on vocals and saxophones.

Biography
In 1996, Boole was formed by Brad Barkett (br0d) and Mike Barkett (The MAB) in Baltimore, Maryland, at Loyola College. After appearing on a few compilations and playing a few shows in the local area, Boole relocated to scenic Washington, DC.

Discography

Albums
The Wooper Du E.P. (Dancing Bull Productions, 1999)
Self-Titled (Dancing Bull Productions, 2000)
Pheromones (Dancing Bull Productions, 2002)
The Vital Few (Dancing Bull Productions/Sonic Mainline Records, February 14, 2008)

Remixes
"The Mask" (Infekktion (U.S.), 2003)
"80's Boy" (Epsilon Minus (Alfa Matrix), 2003)
"Document" (Assemblage 23 (Metropolis Records), 2003)
"Night Riders" (Stromkern (WTII Records), 2003)
"Disease" (Ayria (Alfa Matrix), 2003)
"Burn Witch Burn"/"Severine" (Ego Likeness (Dancing Ferret Discs), 2006)
"Nine Dudes Freaking Out" (The Gothsicles, 2009)
"Hostage"/"Mindphaser (Front Line Assembly, 2010)
"Awakening" (Talamasca (Mind Control Records), 2011)
"Zwara" (Juno Reactor, 2011)
"Voran" (Accessory (band), 2011)
"My Guy Died" (The Gothsicles, 2011)
"Daily War" (The Dark Clan, 2011)
"White Knuckle Head Fuck" (Caustic (band), 2011)
"Get The Party Started" (Pink (singer), 2014)
"Unicorn" (Basement Jaxx, 2014)
"Thriller" (Michael Jackson, 2014)
"Party Killaz" (Godlips, 2014)

Covers
"Pocket Calculator" (Kraftwerk, 1996)
"Rough Sex" (Lords of Acid, 1997)
"Move Any Mountain" (The Shamen, 1999)
"Streetbeater" (Quincy Jones, 1999)
"Mr. Roboto" (Styx, 2000)
"Panic (song)" (The Smiths, 2000)
"Leipzig" (Thomas Dolby, 2000)
"Free Bird" (Lynyrd Skynyrd, 2001)
"(Every Day Is) Halloween" (Ministry, 2002)
"Sub-culture (song)" (New Order, 2003)

Compilations
Greet The Sun, Subcon.01 (Magnetic Resonance, 1998)
Subversitech, Sonic Seducer Cold Hands Seduction Vol. XIV (Sonic Seducer, 2001)
 Pheromones, Emotional Overdrive (Angelfall Studio Compilation Vol. 1, 2002)
 Outcasts, State of Synthpop 2005 (A Different Drum, 2005)
 Smoking Gun, Electronic Saviors: Industrial Music To Cure Cancer (Metropolis Records, 2010)
 Voran (Remix), Electronic Saviors Volume 2: Recurrence (Metropolis Records, 2012)

Side projects
The Apologizers, formed in 1990 by Brad Barkett, featuring many guest artists
The Emptyset, formed in 2000 by Brad Barkett, with Jason "Hated" Taylor of Control.org, Mindstalker, and C2
Mow Down Brown, formed in 2001 by Mike Barkett, with Chris Collins of Fort Chode
Noonerschaft, formed in 2003 by Brad Barkett, with Ned Kirby of Stromkern and Bogart Shwadchuck of Epsilon Minus
Pummeler, formed in 2007 by Brad Barkett, with J.J. Barkett of P.N.D., Spill, and  Damn That's a Big Beetle I Wonder If It's Poisonous

Notes

References
 Washington City Paper interview with Boole (retrieved from the Internet Archive)
  (retrieved from the Internet Archive)
 Last Sigh Magazine - Review of Self-Titled LP, December 21, 2000
 Darktronica "Album of the Year" article on Pheromones, published 7/31/2007
 Review of Self-Titled LP from Se7en (transcribed to official website)

External links
 Official website
 Boole on SoundCloud
 Boole at Discogs

1996 establishments in Maryland
Musical groups established in 1996
Musical groups from Baltimore
Electronic music groups from Maryland